Joseph-Hormisdas Rainville (March 8, 1875 – April 14, 1942) was a lawyer and political figure in Quebec. He represented Chambly—Verchères in the House of Commons of Canada from 1911 to 1917 as a Conservative. Rainville sat for Repentigny division in the Senate of Canada from 1923 to 1942.

He was born in Marieville, Quebec, the son of Isaïe-Denis Rainville and Cornélie Rainville, and was educated at the Université Laval. He was admitted to the bar in 1900 and set up practice in Montreal. Rainville married Ferréola Gendreau in 1910. In 1930, he was named president of the Commission of the Port of Montreal. Rainville died in office at the age of 67.

He was named a Chevalier in the French Légion d'honneur in 1934.

His uncle Henri-Benjamin Rainville served in the Quebec assembly.

References 

Members of the House of Commons of Canada from Quebec
Conservative Party of Canada (1867–1942) senators
Canadian senators from Quebec
Chevaliers of the Légion d'honneur
1875 births
1942 deaths
People from Montérégie
Université Laval alumni